Sona Nala is a stream that passes in Hawke's Bay Town, Karachi, Sindh, Pakistan from northeast to the south and drains into the Arabian Sea.

See also
 Malir Town
 Malir River
 Gogni Nala

References 

Rivers of Karachi